KRBZ (96.5 FM, “Alt 96-5”) is an alternative rock station, licensed to Kansas City, Missouri and serving the Kansas City metropolitan area. The station is owned by Audacy, Inc., with studios located in Mission, Kansas and a transmitter site in Kansas City's East Side.

History

1959-2000: Classical KXTR
KRBZ began broadcasting on September 3, 1959, as classical music station KXTR, and was owned by Telesound Broadcasting, and initially operating at 58,500 watts. Stereo Broadcasters, Inc. bought the station in 1962, and Senthesound Broadcasting bought it three years later. Robert Ingram took over the station in 1976, and KXTR upgraded to 100,000 watts in 1981. Ingram would then sell the station to Heritage Media (and then Sinclair Broadcast Group) in 1997, followed by Entercom in 2000. By the mid-1990s, KXTR replaced much of its live, local airstaff with satellite-fed programming; only mornings were local, as well as "Night on the Town" on Saturdays (which would become syndicated). By the Spring of 2000, KXTR's ratings were tied for 12th place in the 12+ age demographic, with a 3.8 share of the market (and ranked even lower in the 25-54 demographic, though ranked 9th in the 35-64 demographic).

2000-2020: 96.5 The Buzz
On August 17, 2000, at 10 a.m., KXTR was moved to 1250 AM, displacing sports talk station KKGM (now KYYS), and 96.5 began stunting with a ticking clock. At noon, 96.5 flipped formats to a Top 40 format that emphasized on modern rock (also known as a "Rock 40" format), taking aim at rival station KMXV, and was branded as "96.5 The Buzz." The first song played on "The Buzz" was "Learn To Fly" by The Foo Fighters. The current KRBZ call letters were adopted on August 25, 2000.

By 2002, KRBZ moved towards a Hot AC format, most likely due to low ratings with its "Rock 40" format. However, this failed, as the station fell to a 3.1 share of the market (15th place) by the Spring of 2002.

On April 1, 2002, the station stunted as "K-Gay 96.5", playing mostly dance music (in 2019, its HD Radio subchannel would take on Entercom's Channel Q network, which more explicitly and appropriately targets an LGBT audience). The next day, the station refocused as a Modern AC station, as well as introducing a new morning show (titled "The Kenny & Afentra Showgram"). Scott Geiger, known on the radio as Lazlo, was also hired in September 2002 to work nights. "The Kenny & Afentra Showgram" morning show lasted until July 2003, when Kenny Holland was let go, and the show was re-branded as "Afentra's Big Fat Morning Buzz." By September 2003, the station completely shifted to a full-fledged modern rock format, which it continues with today. It returned the alternative rock format to Kansas City for the first time since 1999, when KLZR dumped alternative rock for Top 40/CHR and when KNRX dumped its alternative format for urban oldies. KLZR later changed to an adult top 40 format when KRBZ dumped modern AC.

Also in 2003, KRBZ was nearly pulled off the air when plans for sports station KCSP forced longtime country station WDAF to look for an FM home. Fans gathered to "Save The Buzz", showing a huge turnout and solidifying the station's alternative format. Instead, WDAF moved to 106.5 FM, displacing KCIY, a Smooth Jazz station.

On June 1, 2006, afternoon host/program director Lazlo announced he was leaving the station to become program director of sister station KNDD in Seattle. His then-wife, Afentra, host of morning show "Afentra's Big Fat Morning Buzz," worked her last day from the studios in Kansas City on August 4, but continued to host mornings at KRBZ via satellite from her home in Seattle until November. Her co-hosts remained in Kansas City. Operations Manager Greg Bergen took over as program director in the wake of Lazlo's exit. On September 8, morning co-host Danny Boi announced plans to leave the show and the station. He was replaced as co-host by Slimfast.

On November 10, 2006, it was announced that Lazlo, Afentra, and Slimfast would reunite on-air for "The Church of Lazlo", which broadcast from Seattle on KNDD and simulcast on KRBZ. On February 12, 2007, "The Dick Dale Show with Jessica Chase" debuted as the station's new morning show. Less than a month later, Chase quietly departed the station, ultimately being replaced by Kevin Quinn. On July 9, 2008, the morning show was disbanded with Dick Dale being let go from the station.

On July 17, 2008, Lazlo, Afentra, and Slimfast announced plans to end The Church of Lazlo's run on KNDD. This came shortly after the announcement that former KRBZ Program Director Mike Kaplan would take over programming duties at KNDD.

On August 25, 2008, both "Afentra's Big Fat Morning Buzz" and "The Church of Lazlo" returned live to Kansas City.

In 2014, the station was forced to pay $1 million in a defamation lawsuit that spawned from comments made on the morning show.

Afentra abruptly left the station on August 1, 2018, due to her contract not being extended. Her co-hosts, Danny Boi and Mark Van Sickle, continued the morning show as "Danny and Mark in the Morning". In 2022, Afentra would file an Equal Pay and Discrimination lawsuit against KRBZ for her termination.

On September 24, 2018, Jordin Silver joined Danny Boi and Mark on the morning show, and it was renamed "Mornings with Jordin Silver and Friends". Silver previously worked at KYSR in Los Angeles and KNDD. Danny Boi and Mark eventually left the station.

2020-present: Alt 96.5
On September 14, 2020, KRBZ rebranded as "Alt 96.5.” The move came after Entercom initiated airstaff cuts at their country and alternative formatted stations nationwide, which included morning host Jordin Silver (who would return to the station in April 2022 to host middays remotely from Los Angeles) and night host/"The Church of Lazlo" producer Hartzell Gray (now at WHB) being let go. KRBZ began airing Stryker & Klein (later renamed Klein & Ally) and Megan Holiday from sister KROQ in Los Angeles for mornings and middays, and Kevan Kenney and Bryce Segall from WNYL in New York City for nights and overnights, respectively. In addition, "The Church of Lazlo" remained in afternoons, though it would be syndicated to sister stations in Dallas, Detroit, and Las Vegas; also, former midday host Jeriney Fulcher became a co-host (she has since left the station, and has been replaced by former “Church of Lazlo” co-host Snowcone). In addition, longtime specialty programs such as "Homegrown Buzz", "Resurrection Sunday", "Lazlo's Hardrive", and "Sonic Spectrum" were dropped. On November 15, 2021, KRBZ dropped Klein & Ally, as the show ended syndication to focus on their local audience in Los Angeles. Mornings would run jockless until January 3, 2022, when KRBZ became an affiliate for the WWDC/Washington, D.C.-based "Elliot in the Morning". In August 2022, “The Church of Lazlo” stopped airing in syndication, but continues to air in afternoons on KRBZ. At the end of 2022, KRBZ dropped Elliot in the Morning; mornings are currently jockless.

References

External links

RBZ
HD Radio stations
Alternative rock radio stations in the United States
Radio stations established in 1959
Audacy, Inc. radio stations